Wanderer was the next to last documented ship to bring an illegal cargo of enslaved people from Africa to the United States, landing at Jekyll Island, Georgia, on November 28, 1858. It was the last to carry a large cargo, arriving with some 400 people. Clotilda, which transported 110 people from Dahomey in 1860, is the last known ship to bring enslaved people from Africa to the US. 

Originally built in New York as a pleasure schooner, The Wanderer was purchased by Southern businessman Charles Augustus Lafayette Lamar and an investment group, and used in a conspiracy to import kidnapped people illegally. The Atlantic slave trade had been prohibited under US law since 1808. An estimated 409 enslaved people survived the voyage from the Kingdom of Kongo to Georgia. Reports of the smuggling outraged the North. The federal government prosecuted Lamar and other investors, the captain and crew in 1860, but failed to win a conviction.  

During the American Civil War, Union forces confiscated the ship and used it for various military roles. It was decommissioned in 1865, converted to merchant use, and lost off Cuba in 1871.

In November 2008, the Jekyll Island Museum unveiled an exhibit dedicated to the enslaved Africans on Wanderer. That month also marked the unveiling of a memorial sculpture on southern Jekyll Island dedicated to the enslaved people who were landed there.

Summary 
The trans-Atlantic slave trade was made illegal by both Britain and the United States in 1807, with the two laws coming into effect on 1 May 1807 and 1 January 1808, respectively. The Royal Navy started intercepting illegal slave traders off the coast of Africa in 1807, but serious enforcement activity started in 1808 with the establishment of the West Africa Squadron The British also worked to persuade other nations to end their involvement in slave trading. At the same time, the British began exerting pressure on the African rulers to stop exporting people as slaves. In contrast, the United States made little effort to enforce their legislation until 1820 and 1821, when U.S. naval ships patrolled the West African coast. A level of local co-operation was achieved between the two navies, but the US persisted in forbidding Royal Navy ships to board slavers flying the American flag. Consequently, US colors were a means by which slavers of many nations avoided interception. US Navy ships were next involved in anti-slavery patrols off Africa in 1842 as a result of the Webster–Ashburton Treaty, but with limited effect.

After the U.S. outlawed the transatlantic slave trade, people continued to buy slaves in Africa and bring them to the U.S.. As sectional tensions rose in the late 1850s, there was growing sentiment among some Southerners to reopen the slave trade. The Wanderer was built in 1857 and in 1858 it was partially outfitted for a long voyage. There was considerable speculation about the ship's projected use; it was inspected in New York harbor. As there was no conclusive evidence that it was to be used as a slave ship, it was allowed to pass. It departed flying the pennant of the New York Yacht Club and under command of Captain Corrie.

When the Wanderer stopped in Charleston, South Carolina, on its way to Africa, its mission was so well known that it was greeted with a cannon salute.

Corrie sailed to the mouth of the Congo River in the Kingdom of Kongo (present-day Democratic Republic of the Congo), which was then a Portuguese protectorate with a long-established slave market. For a period of 10 days, he had shelves and pens built into the hold in order to accept a shipment of 490-600 people, who were loaded on the ship.  Many of the people died on the six-week journey across the Atlantic Ocean. Wanderer reached Jekyll Island, Georgia on November 28, 1858, delivering 409 enslaved people alive.

A prosecution of the slave traders was launched, but the defendants were acquitted by the jury in Georgia. The outrage aroused by the case is believed to have contributed to increasing sectional tensions and the American Civil War. The US District judge, John Nicoll, was the father-in-law of Charles A. L. Lamar. The U.S. prosecutor, Henry R. Jackson, became a major general in the Confederate States Army. Defendants John Egbert Farnum and Lamar served as officers on each side of the conflict. Farnum became a colonel and brevet brigadier general in the Union Army. Lamar organized the 7th Georgia Battalion, and later served at the Battle of Columbus. He was the last officer to be killed in the Civil War. Also among the defendants was John Frederick Tucker, a planter and one of the owners of the ship through the investment group.

During the war, the ship was seized by Union troops and used for the Naval blockade of the Confederate States of America. (See .)

Background 

Wanderer was built in a Setauket, New York (Long Island), shipyard in 1857 as a pleasure craft yacht for Colonel John Johnson. While on a trip to New Orleans, Johnson stopped in Charleston, South Carolina and sold the Wanderer to William C. Corrie.

Corrie became a partner with wealthy businessman and cotton planter Charles Augustus Lafayette Lamar (son of Gazaway Bugg Lamar) from Savannah, Georgia. He was hired to transport slaves from Africa, although such importation had been prohibited since 1808 by federal law. Corrie achieved some elements of conversion, but much of the work was accomplished after the ship reached an Angolan port. Both men opposed the restrictions on importing slaves, as demand drove a high price for domestic slaves. The Wanderer was returned to New York to undergo preparation for a long voyage.

Some observers accused the shipyard of preparing it as a slave ship. The ship was inspected and cleared on its voyage out. Public rumors of the ship's being involved in the slave trade persisted and were permanently associated with her name.

Arrival at Jekyll Island and publicity

In his ship's log, Corrie noted arriving at Bengula (probably Benguela in present-day Angola) on October 4, 1858. Wanderer took on 487 slaves between the Congo and Benguela, which is located forty miles south of the Congo river.  After a six-week return voyage across the Atlantic, Wanderer arrived at Jekyll Island, Georgia, around sunset on November 28, 1858.  The tally sheets and passenger records showed that 409 slaves survived the passage. They were landed at Jekyll Island, which was owned by John and Henry DuBignon, Jr., who conspired with Lamar.  These figures present a slightly higher mortality rate than the estimated average of 12 percent during the illegal trading era.  Hoping to evade arrest, Lamar had the slaves shipped to markets in Savannah and Augusta, Georgia, South Carolina, and Florida.

As the federal government investigated, news of the slave ship raised outrage in the North. Southerners pressed Congress to reopen the Atlantic trade. The federal government tried Lamar and his conspirators three times for piracy in Savannah, GA but was unable to get a conviction, possibly due to the jury composed of only white, Southern men. There has also been speculation that one of the judges in the case was Lamar's father-in-law.

Buchanan administration 

The arrival of Wanderer prompted the Buchanan administration to strengthen the United States' role in anti-slave-trade efforts.  Following the dispersion and sale of the 400 Africans throughout the South, there were rumors of subsequent slave ship landings in the region. The Buchanan Administration sent a "secret agent" named Benjamin F. Slocum on a two-month journey to search for evidence.

Slocum, working undercover, spoke with slave traders, plantation owners, and townspeople, hunting down every possible lead. In the end he delivered a detailed report, in which he concluded that the rumors of subsequent landings, "were founded upon the movements of the Wanderer negroes, or else they were mere fabrications, manufactured and circulated for political effect, or to fill a column in a sensation newspaper."

Based on that investigation, Buchanan reported to Congress on December 3, 1860 that "since the date of my last inaugural message not a single slave has been imported into the United States in violation of the laws prohibiting the African slave trade."

Description of Wanderer slaves
The slaves who arrived in the United States on Wanderer gained a celebrity status; the events were covered by newspapers in New York, Washington, and London. They were the only group of slaves who were frequently identified with the ship on which they had been transported. The tendency of newspapers and private correspondence to identify the slaves in this way suggests there were no other known large-scale importations of African slaves in this period. 

But the Clotilda returned in July 1860 from Dahomey to Mobile Bay, Alabama, with a cargo of about 110 surviving slaves. The ship was scuttled and for a time, the smuggling was hidden. In January 2018 it was reported that ruins of a ship were discovered which may be Clotilda. It is the last known ship to have carried slaves to the US before the Civil War.

Wanderers later career

During the next two years, ownership of Wanderer changed several times. 

In November of 1859 the ship sailed again on another slaving expedition, by a crew of 27 "stealing" the vessel from its owner, with the apparent connivance of port officials. According to one report, it sailed in broad daylight, with hundreds looking on; according to another, it left between midnight and 1 AM. The owner, who was suspected of participating or approving, attempted to chase it on another ship, "but he was like the Irishman looking for a day's work, and praying that he might not find it". Near the coast of Africa, the first mate led a mutiny and left her captain at sea in a small boat. The mate said he had been forced onto the ship and prevented from getting off. He sailed Wanderer to Fire Island, then Boston, Massachusetts. After he arrived at Boston on 24 December 1859, the mate turned her over to federal authorities, and 10 men were imprisoned; those who had been forced onto the ship were released.

In April 1861, upon the outbreak of the American Civil War, the United States Government seized Wanderer to prevent her from falling into the hands of the Confederate States of America.  She served in the United States Navy from then until June 1865, being used as a gunboat, a tender, and a hospital ship. After she had been sold into mercantile service in June 1865, Wanderer operated commercially until on 12 January 1871, when she was lost off Cape Maisí, Cuba.

Legacy and commemoration
Most historians long believed that Wanderer was the last slave ship to reach the U.S., including W. E. B. Du Bois, in his book The Suppression of the African Slave-Trade to the United States of America, 1638–1870. But the schooner Clotilda landed slaves in 1860 and is the last known slave ship to bring captives to the US. 
   
In 2008, the state of Georgia erected a monument to Wanderers  African survivors on the south tip of Jekyll Island. The monument consists of three  steel sails and several historical storyboards. On November 25, 2008 a dedication of the memorial was held, attended by 500 participants, including descendants of slaves carried by Wanderer, and Erik Calonius, author of The Wanderer: The Last American Slave Ship and the Conspiracy that Set Its Sails (2008). He is credited with reviving interest in the story of Wanderer.

See also
 USS Wanderer (1857) - more about the ship

Citations

References

External links
 "Wanderer I (Schooner)", Dictionary of American Naval Fighting Ships

Angolan-American history
Congolese-American history
Slavery in the United States
Sailing ships
Slave ships
Ships built in New York (state)
1857 ships
Pre-emancipation African-American history
Jekyll Island
Post-1808 importation of slaves to the United States